Alexander Moutchnik (born 6 October 1976) is a professor of media economics and media management. He focuses on social media, media history, sustainability and corporate social responsibility. Since 2013 Moutchnik has been teaching at the RheinMain University of Applied Sciences in Wiesbaden (Germany) in the Department of Design, Computer Science and Media.

Education
In addition to his master's study in history, sociology and political science at the State Pedagogical University in Saint Petersburg from 1993 to 1997, he completed a diploma in history at the French University College of Saint Petersburg from 1995 to 1997. He completed this with the Diplôme d'Études et de Recherche (D.E.R.) on the topic "The image of Russia in the periodicals edited by Jean Henri Samuel Formey and in his correspondence in the middle of the 18th century at the time of Elisavéta Petrovna (1741-1761)". The reviewer was Wladimir Berelowitch. From 1997 to 2001, Moutchnik studied economics at the University of Heidelberg, graduating with a degree in economics for his thesis on “System-theoretical cybernetic modeling of the holistic corporate management system with a balanced scorecard using the practical example of Heidelberger Druckmaschinen AG". In 2002, he completed a master's degree in Middle, Modern and Eastern European History at the University of Heidelberg, which he had begun in 1997. The degree of Magister Artium was achieved with the master's thesis on "Development of international scientific relations in Europe in the second half of the 18th century" (reviewers: Eike Wolgast and Heinz-Dietrich Löwe). In 2005, Moutchnik was awarded a doctorate in Modern History (Dr. phil.) on the topic "Research and Teaching in the second half of the 18th century. The natural scientist and university professor Christian Mayer SJ (1719-1783)". From 2003 to 2007 he received his doctorate in business administration with a thesis on the topic "Standardization of Corporate Environmental Management. Business case: Multinational Cement Corporation" also at the University of Heidelberg.

Professional activities
From April 2004 to March 2008, Moutchnik was a research assistant at Dietfried Günter Liesegang's chair of business administration at the University of Heidelberg. Subsequently, until August 2013, head of the study course "Media and Communication Management" at the Mediadesign University in Munich. Since October 2013 Moutchnik is professor for media management and media economics at the RheinMain University of Applied Sciences in the department of design, computer science and media in Wiesbaden.

Projects at the RheinMain University of Applied Sciences in Wiesbaden 
 2019/20: Encyclopedia of Internet Phenomena: www.internetphaenomene.de
 2019: Highlights from the history of the Hessian State Archive on YouTube
 2014/16: Branding of historical heritage (State Palaces, Gardens and State Museums) of Hesse

Other commitments 
Moutchnik is deputy chairman of the senate election committee of the RheinMain University of Applied Sciences and was head of the master's program "Media & Design Management" from 2014 to 2018. He is editorial board member of the "International Journal of Corporate Social Responsibility" of the SpringerNature and member of the editorial board "Sustainability Management Forum" of the same publishing house. He is a member of the Presseclub Wiesbaden.

Literature

Media management and media economics

Sustainability and corporate social responsibility

History

References

External links 

 Profilseite bei der Hochschule RheinMain

1976 births
Academics from Saint Petersburg
German social scientists
Living people